Vasantrao Naik Mahavidyalaya, Aurangabad, is an undergraduate and postgraduate, coeducational college situated in Aurangabad, Maharashtra. It was established in the year 1972. The college is affiliated with Dr. Babasaheb Ambedkar Marathwada University.

Departments

Science
Physics
Mathematics
Chemistry
Botany
Zoology
Computer Science

Arts and Commerce
Marathi
English
Hindi
History
Politics
Public Administration
Psychology
Sociology
Physical Education
Commerce

Notable faculty
Sukhadeo Thorat

Accreditation
The college is  recognized by the University Grants Commission (UGC).

References

External links

Dr. Babasaheb Ambedkar Marathwada University
Universities and colleges in Maharashtra
Educational institutions established in 1972
1972 establishments in Maharashtra